Richard Revell Harding (9 February 1934 – 8 February 2007) was a Canadian sprinter. He competed in the men's 100 metres at the 1956 Summer Olympics. Harding competed in the 440 yards at the 1954 British Empire and Commonwealth Games, failing to progress past the heats.

References

External links
 
 

1934 births
2007 deaths
Athletes (track and field) at the 1954 British Empire and Commonwealth Games
Athletes (track and field) at the 1955 Pan American Games
Athletes (track and field) at the 1956 Summer Olympics
Commonwealth Games competitors for Canada
Canadian male sprinters
Olympic track and field athletes of Canada
Sportspeople from Chatham-Kent
Pan American Games track and field athletes for Canada